The Amru Al-As Mosque (Malay: Masjid Amru Al-As) is a prominent mosque in Bandar Baru Sentul, Kuala Lumpur, Malaysia.

History
The mosque was constructed since 3 May 1995 until 18 August 1997. It was then opened in 1998.

See also
 Islam in Malaysia

References

1997 establishments in Malaysia
Mosques in Kuala Lumpur
Mosques completed in 1997